Marmara University Prof. Dr. Asaf Ataseven Hospital is a public hospital in Maltepe district of Istanbul, Turkey. It was opened in June 2020.

History
Its construction began on 7 October 1991, but continued many years with interruptions. In 2018, Marmara University signed a protocol of affiliation with the Ministry of Health. The project was revised to comply with the Health Ministry's regulations in force.

The hospital was partly opened in April 2020 for the treatment of COVID-19 patients only. The official inauguration following the completion took place on 20 June 2020. Named in the beginning Ministry of Health Marmara University Hospital, it was renamed after Asaf Ataseven (1932–2008), a general surgeon and academic.

Location
It is located in Maltepe district on the Asian part of Istanbul Province facing the D-100 highway and taking the advantage of the Sabiha Gökçen International Airport and the M4 metro line.

Characteristics
It is constructed on a base of 827 seismic base isolators, designed to withstand earthquakes without disruptions to service.

It features 155 clinics, 28 operating theaters and a total of 535 beds, including 60 intensive care unit (ICU) beds and 304 single-room beds.

References

Hospitals in Istanbul
Hospitals established in 2020
2020 establishments in Turkey
Maltepe, Istanbul
Government-owned hospitals in Turkey
Marmara University
Teaching hospitals in Turkey